Iskra Delta Partner was a computer developed by Iskra Delta in 1983.

Specifications
 Text mode: 26 lines with 80 or 132 characters each
 Character set: YUSCII
 I/O ports: three RS-232C, one used to connect printer (1200-4800 bit/s) and two general-purpose (300-9600 bit/s)

References

External links
 Old-Computer.com article

Microcomputers